This is a list of electricity-generating power stations in the U.S. state of Maine, sorted by type and name. In 2020, Maine had a total summer capacity of 4,875 MW through all of its power plants, and a net generation of 10,002 GWh. The corresponding electrical energy generation mix in 2021 was 27.1% hydroelectric, 24.7% natural gas, 23.3% wind, 19.9% biomass, 2.4% non-biogenic waste, 1.6% solar, 0.6% coal, and 0.4% petroleum. Small-scale solar, which includes customer-owned photovoltaic panels, delivered an additional net 136 GWh of energy to the state's electrical grid.  This was about equal to the amount generated by Maine's utility-scale photovoltaic plants.

During 2021, renewable sources generated 74% of all electrical energy from Maine, making it one of the top-five U.S. states. Maine's share of wind generation is the largest among New England states, and its share of biomass generation from the wood industry and municipal waste sources is the largest in the United States. Maine's electricity generation has not met the in-state demand in recent years, and about one-quarter of its electricity consumption was imported from Canada.

Nuclear power stations
The Maine Yankee Nuclear Power Plant generated 860 MW of base load electricity during years 1972–1996.  Decommissioning was completed in 2005.  Maine had no utility-scale plants that used fissile material as a fuel in 2019.

Fossil-fuel power stations
Data from the U.S. Energy Information Administration serves as a general reference.

Coal-fired
The Rumford Cogeneration and S D Warren Plants previously burned coal as primary fuel, and continued to burn it as secondary fuel in 2019 (see Biomass).   Maine had no operating utility-scale plants that used coal as a primary fuel in 2019.

Natural gas-fired

Petroleum-fired
Maine's petroleum-fired plants were operated as peaker plants in 2019.

 16.2MW battery storage capacity added at Wyman Station in 2016.

Renewable Power Stations
Data from the U.S. Energy Information Administration serves as a general reference.

Biomass and Municipal Waste

 In operation since 1906, original units retired.

Hydroelectric

 In operation since 1906, original units retired. 
 Retirement pending
See also: Natural Resources Council of Maine Hydro Facilities

Wind

Solar

 0.6MW ground array + 0.6MW rooftop solar

Storage power stations
Data from the U.S. Energy Information Administration serves as a general reference.

Battery storage

References

Lists of buildings and structures in Maine
 
Maine
Energy in Maine